The 2008 International Pokka 1000 km was the 6th round of the 2008 Super GT season and the 37th running of the 1000 km Suzuka. It took place on August 24, 2008.

Race results
Results are as follows:

Statistics
GT500 Pole Position – #100 Raybrig NSX – 2:27.474
GT300 Pole Position – #77 Cusco Impreza – 2:22.432
GT500 Fastest Lap – #1 ARTA NSX – 1:57.897
GT300 Fastest Lap – #19 WedsSport IS350 – 2:09.340
Winner's Race Time – 5:56:31.327

References

Suzuka 1000km